Yongle railway station may refer to:

 Yongle railway station (Beijing), a future station on the Beijing–Tianjin intercity railway in Tongzhou District, Beijing
 Yongle railway station (Taiwan), a TRA station in Yilan County, Taiwan